Lake Boonderoo is an ephemeral freshwater lake located in the Goldfields-Esperance region of Western Australia.

The lake covers an area of roughly  when full. It is fed by Ponton Creek on its north western side.

The lake lies mostly within the boundaries of Boonderoo and Kanandah Stations which were established in the 1960s and have been running cattle since 1973. The lake has filled in 1975 following heavy rain events further north near Leonora after a cyclone. The next time the lake filled was in 1995 following Cyclone Bobby.

Lake Boonderoo is an important wetland for birds and invertebrates as it dries out and becomes increasingly saline. In 2005 the lake was found to have a  infestation of the invasive weed, the tamarisk tree.

See also

 List of lakes of Western Australia

References

Lakes of Goldfields-Esperance (Western Australia)
Nullarbor Plain